Muskoka was a federal electoral district represented in the House of Commons of Canada from 1872 to 1882 and from 1904 to 1925. It was located in the province of Ontario. 

This riding was first created from part of Victoria North and from areas that until then were unrepresented.

It initially consisted of the Townships of Morrison, Ryde, Muskoka, Draper, Oakley, Wood, Monck, Macauley, McLean, Medora, Watt, Stephenson, Brunel, Humphrey, Cardwell, Stisted, Chaffey, Christie, Monteith, McMurrich, Matchitt, Ryerson, Spence, McKellar, McDougall, Ferguson, Carling, Hagerman, Croft, Chapman, Ferrie, Mackenzie, Wilson, Brown, Blair, Mowat Cowper, Conger, Parry Island, Parry Sound, Aumick Lake Territory, Maganetawan, and all other surveyed townships lying north of the North Riding of Victoria, and south of the Nipissing District.

The electoral district was abolished in 1882 when it was redistributed between Muskoka and Parry Sound, Ontario North and Simcoe East ridings. 

It was re-created in 1903 from Muskoka and Parry Sound riding, and consisted of the territorial district of Muskoka.

The electoral district was abolished in 1924 when it was merged into Muskoka—Ontario riding.

Electoral history

1872–1882

|}

|}

|}

1903-1924

|}

|}

|}

|}

|}

See also 

 List of Canadian federal electoral districts
 Past Canadian electoral districts

External links 
 Library of Parliament website: 1872 to 1882
 Library of Parliament website: 1904 to 1925

Former federal electoral districts of Ontario